The LuminAID is a solar-rechargeable light that packs flat and inflates to diffuse light like a lantern. LuminAID technology was invented in 2010 by Anna Stork and Andrea Sreshta.

Anna Stork and Andrea Sreshta

Anna Stork and Andrea Sreshta met at Columbia University’s Graduate School of Architecture with no previous knowledge or intention of developing a social innovation. However, after a 7.0 magnitude earthquake and a series of eight aftershocks hit Haiti in January of 2010 there was an immense need for disaster relief assistance. Their architecture class pivoted and tasked students with developing a solution aimed at remedying the aftermath in Haiti. While many focused on providing solutions tailored to immediate necessities such as food, water, or medical supplies, Sreshta and Stork looked in a different direction. After speaking to a relief worker who was experiencing the problem in a real world context, they realized the need for an essential that is wiped away after disaster hits, light. In New York City, they developed a tangible solution that would dramatically improve the lives of many who lived thousands of miles away. Shortly after developing their brand, the pair appeared on Shark Tank where they walked away with a large investment from Mark Cuban after having received offers from every one of the investors.
	LuminAID was born with the vision of creating a solar powered, waterproof, inflatable light. Designed with simplicity in mind, the easy to use compactible light can be distributed after disasters with low cost as a replacement for electricity. 
The main issue with the existing solution of kerosene lamps is their danger to human health. They are “hazardous and toxic.” Kerosene has been known to generate combustion products which in turn may cause damaging health effects such as cancer, respiratory ailments, or even death. The kerosene lamps, although small, should not be overlooked, as close proximity of the user and amount of usage dangerously increase the likelihood of damaging impacts on health. The LuminAID solution recognized this pain point and aimed to replace the kerosene lamp used by many after the disaster hit. The light will be useful for 16 hours after being charged for only 6, and is a much healthier and safer alternative. 
	Knowing that they needed to establish a business in order to be successful, LuminAID began by balancing profit with philanthropy. Outdoor enthusiasts were a large market interested in their product and they capitalized on that in the beginning. After gaining a substantial following, the Give Light Get Light campaign was released in 2011 whereupon one light is given for every one light purchased. The company now works with a large number of humanitarian organizations in tandem with the project. 
	The innovation by these two women has had great impacts on our world today. They have aided refugees in Syria, Nepal, and most recently, Ukraine to name just a few. Additionally, they have provided disaster relief beginning with Haiti all the way through to annually assisting places like Puerto Rico during hurricane season. 
	LuminAID is very much still in use. Consumers purchase the product for personal use such as camping or outdoor needs, or for home emergency kits most generally. However, the company’s social impact is most prominent as it grows with every purchase and even more through partnerships with humanitarian organizations and the “give light” option that consumers may use to purchase a LuminAID directly for a refugee, disaster relief, or other cause. 
	These two women have had an incredible impact on social innovation and managed to create an incredibly successful company in the process.

Product 

The LuminAID light has a solar panel, rechargeable battery, and a multi-chip LED light. According to its makers, after a full charge, it can deliver 35 lumens for 8 hours or 20 lumens for 16 hours and the battery can be recharged over 500 times, for years of use.

The product has won first place in several business competitions, including the $100K Midwest 2013 Clean Energy Challenge, the William James Business Plan Competition, and the Chicago Booth School of Business Social New Venture Challenge. In 2016, LuminAID was granted a patent by the United States Patent Office  for their lighting technology.

History 

LuminAID Lab is the manufacturer and producer of LuminAID lights. The company was founded in 2011 by Anna Stork and Andrea Sreshta, who invented the technology in 2010 in response to the 2010 Haiti earthquake while at Columbia Graduate School of Architecture, Planning and Preservation. They later experienced firsthand the damage caused by large-scale disasters while on a school trip during the March 2011 earthquake in Japan.

The inventors saw its potential as an outdoor recreation accessory in the US and began marketing it in that way. Its launch was linked to Indiegogo in an arrangement whereby purchasers could either buy two for $25, with one unit sent to a developing country, or buy a single unit for $10 to be donated.

As of July 2021, LuminAID's website has 9 different solar lanterns for sale, along with a solar speaker.

Shark Tank appearance
Stork and Sreshta appeared on ABC's Shark Tank in February 2015 seeking a deal to fund their company. They received offers from all five of the "sharks," and accepted a deal with Mark Cuban for $200,000 for 15 percent of their company's equity.

Sreshta said that Cuban has helped her and Stork to stay innovative. LuminAID's solar lanterns now double as phone chargers, and the lanterns are being sold in retail stores for camping and outdoor use too.

Partnership with ShelterBox 
After working together to distribute lights in the Philippines in 2013 after a typhoon, LuminAID and ShelterBox, an organization that provides disaster relief services, became strategic partners.

See also 
 Solight Design
 Solar lamp
 Solar-powered flashlight

References

External links 
Official website

Companies established in 2011
Companies based in Chicago
Solar energy companies
Social enterprises
Solar-powered devices